Eden High School is a public high school located in Eden, Texas (USA) and classified as a 1A school by the UIL  It is part of the Eden Consolidated Independent School District located in south central Concho County.  In 2015, the school was rated "Met Standard" by the Texas Education Agency.

Athletics
The Eden Bulldogs compete in these sports - 

Basketball
Cross Country
6-Man Football
Golf
Powerlifting
Softball
Tennis
Track and Field

References

External links
Eden Consolidated ISD
List of Six-man football stadiums in Texas

Education in Concho County, Texas
Public high schools in Texas
Public middle schools in Texas